King Karol was a New York City, New York-based record store chain founded by Ben Karol and Phil King in 1952.

Lasting through at least 1987, and defunct for some time by 1993, King Karol was one of New York's "largest [and most] comprehensive" music stores.

Locations
Aside from its main branch at 126 West 42nd Street in Manhattan, King Karol by mid-1971 had outlets at 460 West 42nd Street, at the corner of 10th Avenue; 940 Third Avenue, at East 57th Street; 609 Fifth Avenue, at 49th Street, in the KLM Building; and, in Flushing, Queens, at 40-46 Main Street. Later, the chain opened at least one other location, at 1521 Third Avenue, at East 86th Street, and, by mid-1975, at 1500 Broadway, at West 43rd Street.

During the early days of the firm, a store was located at 111 West 42nd Street, at 6th Avenue, from sometime before 1954 until 1976 when it was replaced by the 126 West 42nd Street location. During most of the 1950s, this was the sole store. In the 1960s and early 1970s, this was the flagship store of the chain.

After 1976, the 126 West 42nd Street location served as the flagship until it closed sometime around the beginning of 1985.

During the 1960s, stores were also located at 254 West 34th Street (1961–1966); 153 West 42nd Street (1961–1961); 48 West 48th Street (1965–1966); and 444 West 42nd Street (1966–1966).

During the 1970s, stores were also located at 940 Third Avenue, at 57th Street (1969–1980); 460 West 42nd Street, at 10th Avenue, in the West Side Airlines Terminal Building (1970.–1977); in Flushing, Queens, at 40-46 Main Street (1970–1980); 609 Fifth Avenue, at 49th Street, in the KLM Building (1971–1978); 1500 Broadway, at West 43rd Street in the National General Building, Times Square (1972–after 1987); 7 West 48th Street (1977–1981); and 1521 Third Avenue, at 86th Street (1979–after 1987).

Later years
In 1981, Ben Karol experimented with record album rentals, similar to the then-emerging market for videocassette rental, after having studied successful record rental systems in Canada. He told an interviewer, "The record industry isn't that great these days. You sit around and think of ways to stimulate it, try to come up with ideas based on what similar product is doing. ... [T]he whole video tape business is now going rental".

A year later, in 1982, the chain had four stores and began to include a video tape rental service that was provided by an outside vendor. Ben Karol said 1987 he subleases the video department to an outside vendor saying that he is "still a records man".

Toward the end of 1982, the chain was reduced to three stores and the owners King and Karol were considering the possible sale of the remaining. Around this time, Tower Records was building a 34,000-square foot superstore in Manhattan and locally owned Sam Goody had recently sold itself to the parent of Musicland which made it possible for Sam Goody to expand nationally. King died shortly afterward, in 1983. By late 1984, Tower made it very difficult for small independents to compete.

By 1987, the company was down to two stores, from seven at its height. Ben Karol died in 1993 after a long illness.

King Karol also operated a mail order record business through P.O. Box 629, Times Square Station, New York, New York 10036.

In the media
The King Karol branch at 460 West 42nd Street, with its lit sign in a nighttime scene, is visible during the bus-chase sequence in the 1973 New York City police film Badge 373, immediately before the bus crashes into an Army/Navy store. The name King Karol can be seen in the 2016 film Ghostbusters during the climactic scenes in Times Square when billboard advertisements revert to defunct brands.

References

External links
 
  Link via ProQuest.
  Link via ProQuest.

Defunct companies based in New York City
Music retailers of the United States
1952 establishments in New York City
Retail companies established in 1952